Mount Nakayama (中山, Nakayama) is a mountain in Takarazuka, Hyōgo Prefecture, Japan.

Location 
It is located west side of the city, and has a Nakayamadera temple in front of it.  The height of the mountain is 478 meters, but this mountain is very popular for hikers around Osaka-Kobe Area, because of the great view of Osaka metropolitan area from the top of the mountain.  This mountain also has good connections to the railway stations.

Access 
 Nakayama-kannon Station of Hankyu Takarazuka Line
 Nakayamadera Station of Fukuchiyama Line.

References 

Nakayama